War depictions in film and television include documentaries, TV mini-series, and drama serials depicting aspects of historical wars.

Ancient history  (3050 BC – AD 476)

The Middle Ages  (476 – 1453)

Early Modern history (1453 - 1775)

The Age of Revolution and Empire (1775-1914)

The Age of Extremes: The Short 20th Century (1914-1945) 

Note: From World war I to World War II

The Age of Extremes: The Short 20th Century (1945-2001) 

Note: From the start of the Cold War until the end in 1990s

The War on Terror & The 21st Century (2001-present)

Mercenaries in the third world 
(See also: Mercenaries in popular culture: Films)

 Geschwader Fledermaus (Bat Squadron) (1957)
 Cerný prapor (The Black Battalion/Das schwarze Bataillon/Bataillon des Teufels) (1958)
 Kommando 52 (Commando 52) (1965)
 Der lachende Mann – Bekenntnisse eines Mörders (The Laughing Man – Confessions of a Killer) (1966)
 Africa Addio (Africa – Blood and Guts) (1966)
 Der Fall Bernd K. (The Case of Bernd K.) (1967)
 PS zum lachenden Mann (PS to the Laughing Man) (1967)
 The Last Mercenary (1968)
 Seduto alla sua destra (Black Jesus) (1968)
 Dark of the Sun/The Mercenaries (1968)
 Sette Baschi Rossi (The Red Berets) (1969)
 The Last Grenade (1970)
 Immer wenn der Steiner kam (Every Time Steiner Came) (1976), not released
 High Velocity (1976)
 Scorticateli Vivi (Wild Geese Attack/Skin 'Em Alive) (1978)
 The Wild Geese (1978)
 The Dogs of War (1981)
 Code Name: Wild Geese (1984)
 Commando Leopard (1985)
 Men of War (1994)
 Mister BOB (2011) (TV)
 Soldiers of Fortune (2012)

See also 

 War film
 Combat in film
 Middle Ages in film
 Historical drama
 List of World War II films
 List of films set in the Interwar period
 List of historical drama films and series set in Near Eastern and Western civilization

References 

Lists of films by genre